Piece of Love is the debut studio album by Japanese singer and songwriter Aiko Kitahara. It was released on November 19, 2003, through Giza Studio.

The album consists of five previous released singles, such as grand blue, Sun rise train/Kimi wo Egaku Sono Mirai, Himawari no You ni, Nijiiro ni Hikaru Umi and special days!!. Special days had received renewed version under title album mix.

The album charted at #50 on the Oricon charts in its first week. It charted for two weeks sold more than 4,000 copies.

Track listing

In media
grand blue – opening theme for Anime television series Tenshi na Konamaiki
Sun rise train – opening theme for Anime television series Tenshi na Konamaiki
Nijiiro ni Hikaru Umi – ending theme for Anime television series Tantei Gakuen Q
Himawari no You ni – ending theme for Nihon TV program Mogu Mogu Gombo
special days!! – ending theme for Yomiuri TV program Pro no Doumyaku.

References

2003 debut albums
Aiko Kitahara albums
Being Inc. albums
Japanese-language albums
Giza Studio albums
Albums produced by Daiko Nagato